Day Peckinpaugh is a historic canal motorship berthed at the Matton Shipyard on Peebles Island, Cohoes in Albany County, New York, United States.

Early years
Day Peckinpaugh was built in 1921 by the McDougall-Duluth Shipyard in Duluth, Minnesota, the first boat specially designed and built for New York State Barge Canal, the successor to the famed Erie Canal. The ship was originally named ILI101 after the ship's first owner, the Interwaterways Lines Inc of New York City. The ship was the first specifically designed to ply the open waters of the Great Lakes as well as the narrow locks and shallow waterways of the barge canal. Day Peckinpaugh is also the last surviving ship from a fleet of more than 100 of her type that once carried freight from the upper Midwest to the port of New York City.

First renaming
ILI101 was rechristened Richard J. Barnes in 1922 to honor the man who originally commissioned the ship.

World War II service
During World War II, Richard J. Barnes was drafted into the US Merchant Marine to carry coal and refuel cargo ships along the east coast of the United States. During her Merchant Marine service Richard J. Barnes was attacked by a German U-boat which fired a torpedo at her; the torpedo was thought to have passed under the ship due to her shallow seven foot draft.

Second renaming
In 1958, the ship was sold to Erie Navigation and retrofitted to carry sand and gravel. The ship was again renamed, becoming Day Peckinpaugh, in honor of the man of the same name, brother of the New York Yankees player and manager, Roger Peckinpaugh.

Later service
The ship was converted to a self-unloading dry cement hauler in 1961 and used to carry cement from Oswego to Rome, New York until her retirement in 1994. Day Peckinpaugh was the last self-propelled regularly scheduled commercial hauler on the barge canal.

Restoration
In 2005 Day Peckinpaugh was saved from the scrap yard by a partnership of museums and canal preservation societies, and is undergoing extensive cleaning, painting, restoration and testing of her engines. More than $3 million has been pledged to restore and convert Day Peckinpaugh into a floating classroom and museum that will highlight the history and heritage of the Erie Canal and the Great Lakes. In late 2011 the New York State Department of Education received a $191,000 grant to outfit Day Peckinpaugh to serve as a multi-regional educational facility. The restoration was scheduled for completion in 2012. The ‘‘Day Peckinpaugh’’ is the largest artifact in the New York State Museum collection.

Attempted sinking
On March 8, 2010 Guy J. Pucci, a 35-year-old ex-state employee was arrested after almost completely sinking the ship while she was docked at Lock 2 of the Barge Canal undergoing restoration. Pucci went aboard the vessel and opened valves to flood the ship in an attempt to scuttle her. State Police said that Day Peckinpaugh was close to being submerged as police and ship employees worked to pump the water from the ship's engine rooms. The ship sustained extensive damage due to the flooding, and repairs were estimated to be in excess of $10,000.

Pucci had worked aboard Day Peckinpaugh since July 2009, but his position as a maintenance assistant had been terminated February 25, 2010. On September 15, 2010, Pucci was sentenced to time served and five years' probation, including drug treatment court, after pleading guilty to a felony third-degree criminal mischief charge.

Current status
The ship was listed on the National Register of Historic Places in 2005. At the time of its listing, it was located at Lockport in Niagara County, New York, but its home base between trips and for maintenance is in Cohoes.

Day Peckinpaugh and the 1901 tugboat Urger, as still-functioning vessels, have become movable ambassadors of the New York State Barge Canal System.

As of 2018 it was considered a possible candidate for sinking as a reef due to maintenance costs.

Gallery

References

 Jon Crispin's Day Peckinpaugh page

 Tugster's 100 anniversary blog entry for Day Peckinpaugh

Other websites

Albany County, New York
Ships on the National Register of Historic Places in New York (state)
1921 ships
Erie Canal parks, trails, and historic sites
National Register of Historic Places in Albany County, New York
Museum ships in New York (state)